Operation Yellowstone may refer to:

Operation Yellowstone (Vietnam) (1967–1968), a military engagement in the Vietnam War
Operation Yellow Stone, a 2004 military operation during the Iraq War